Rachel L. Swarns (born 1967) is an American author, news correspondent and investigative reporter. Swarns has been a reporter and news correspondent for The New York Times since 1995, and a weekly columnist since 2013. Swarms has been a foreign correspondent for the Times while reporting from Cuba, Russia and southern Africa (where she was the Johannesburg bureau chief). Swarns wrote the book American Tapestry (2012) about the history of Michelle Obama's ancestors, and co-authored the book Unseen: Unpublished Black History from the New York Times Photo Archives.

Background
Before Swarns began working for the New York Times, she worked for the Miami Herald and the Tampa Bay Times (then the St. Petersburg Times). She has covered the justice system, federal courts and policing, including the L.A. riots. She has reported from Cuba and covered Guantanamo Bay and the Cuba visit by former Pope John Paul II. Swarns was part of a team that investigated the aftermath of Hurricane Andrew, which won a Pulitzer Prize. She covered the 2004 and 2008 presidential campaigns.

Swarns did a series of investigative stories in 2016 regarding Georgetown University's connection to slavery, which received nationwide attention. She wrote an investigative series about black professional elites in South Africa, reported on welfare reform policies of Rudolph Giuliani, health care, homelessness, racial relations in South Africa, Zimbabwe civil strife, and the Angola civil war.

Personal life 
Swarns is Catholic.

References 

1967 births
Living people
African-American Catholics